Haplolobus is a genus of plant in family Burseraceae.

Species include:
 Haplolobus beccarii, Husson
 Haplolobus bintuluensis, Kochummen
 Haplolobus inaequifolius, Kochummen
 Haplolobus kapitensis, Kochummen
 Haplolobus leenhoutsii, Kochummen
 Haplolobus sarawakanus, Kochummen

References

 
Burseraceae genera
Taxonomy articles created by Polbot